A total lunar eclipse will take place on February 11, 2036.

Visibility

Related lunar eclipses

Lunar year series

Tzolkinex 
 Preceded: Lunar eclipse of December 31, 2028

 Followed: Lunar eclipse of December 25, 2043

See also
List of lunar eclipses and List of 21st-century lunar eclipses

Notes

External links

2036-02
2036-02
2036 in science